The Poor People's Economic Human Rights Campaign (PPEHRC) is a coalition of grassroots organizations, community groups, and non-profit organizations in the United States of America committed to uniting the poor across color lines as the basis for a broad movement to abolish poverty.  The PPEHRC seeks to advance economic human rights as outlined in Articles 23, 25, and 26 of the Universal Declaration of Human Rights.  These include the rights to education, food, health, housing, communication, and a living wage job.

History
The Poor People's Economic Human Rights Campaign was founded by Cheri Honkala and formally established in 1998.  The PPEHRC was spearheaded by the now defunct affordable housing advocacy organization Kensington Welfare Rights Union (KWRU).  In June 1998 KWRU organized the New Freedom Bus Tour, a national bus tour to bring awareness to the issues of poverty and economic human rights.  During the tour KWRU made contact with many groups and organizations from across the country that were interested in working to gain and ensure economic human rights for all people.  In October 1998 the Poor People's Summit on Human Rights was held in Philadelphia, PA with many organizations dedicated to economic human rights in attendance.  It was out of this meeting and the New Freedom Bus Tour that the Poor People's Economic Human Rights Campaign was formed. The Poor People's Economic Human Right's Campaign announced it was organizing a "March for Our Lives" at the 2016 Democratic National Convention.

Member organizations
Most member organizations of the PPEHRC are community-based and headed by people living in poverty themselves.  The organizations are varied, and do not all focus exclusively – or even primarily – on the economic aspect of human rights.  However all member organizations agree to endorse and participate in the collective work of the campaign.

University of the Poor
The University of the Poor is a community-based, web-centered institution dedicated to training and educating leaders in the larger movement to end poverty.  It was created in 1999 as the national education division of the PPEHRC and was intended to focus on the unity and development of the leaders of the campaign.  The University of the Poor is not a degree-granting organization.

The University of the Poor was brought about as a result of the gathering of economic human rights groups that occurred for the March of the Americas.  During the march it was realized that each group had complementary skills, knowledge, and experiences that would benefit the movement if they were shared and taught among member groups.

The University of the Poor carries out Economic Human Rights Organizing Schools with grassroots organizations across the United States. These schools are based on the needs and struggles of each organization, teaching the lessons accumulated by the experiences of the movement to end poverty.  These schools use strategies such as roundtable discussions, "train-the-trainer" sessions, and provide specific, action-oriented tools like books and videos.

As of May 1, 2008, the founders and staff of the University of the Poor resigned from the Poor People's Economic Human Rights Campaign (PPEHRC). The  University of the Poor was reconstituted as an independent organization, one no longer affiliated with the Poor People's Economic Human Rights Campaign (PPEHRC).

Events
The Poor People's Economic Human Rights Campaign and its member organizations have held many events to raise awareness of and draw attention to the systematic denial of economic human rights in the United States.  These events also seek to highlight those who benefit from this denial of economic human rights.   Included in these events are:
 1998– New Freedom Bus Tour
 1999– March of the Americas: representatives from Central and South America and Canada joined PPEHRC organizations on a march from Washington, D.C. to the United Nations in New York City; the march started in October, lasted a month, and concluded with a conference focused on education and organization for building the movement.
 2000– March for Economic Human Rights
 2000– March on the opening day of the Republican National Convention in Philadelphia, PA that was attended by thousands of people
 2001– March for Compassion and Spiritual Renewal
 2001– Poor People's Summit to End Poverty
 2002– National Freedom Bus Tour: crossed the country between November 10 and December 10.
 2002– March for Our Lives
 2003– Poor People's March for Economic Human Rights through the South: held in August to commemorate the thirty-fifth anniversary of the 1968 Poor People's March which Dr. Martin Luther King, Jr. was organizing when he was assassinated.
2004– March on the opening day of the Republican National Convention in New York City
 2005– Week-long University of the Poor Leadership School: classes, workshops, and other activities held at Bryn Mawr College in July, which brought together more than a hundred leaders of PPEHRC member organizations from across the United States.
 2006– National Truth Commission: held in Cleveland, Ohio in July; brought people together from across the United States and around the world to bring attention to the indisputable suffering of people living in extreme poverty; a panel of domestic and international commissioners and social leaders heard and evaluated testimonies of violations on the rights to health, education, housing, water, and other basic needs, as well as on the removal of children from or the failure to return children to their homes as a result of failure by the government to meet the economic human rights of families.

References

External links
Poor People's Economic Human Rights Campaign Official Site
University of the Poor website

Economic advocacy groups in the United States
Human rights organizations based in the United States